Wong Kew-Lit (黄巧力) is a Malaysian film director and producer.

Biography
Wong Kew-Lit, born June 1971, is a prolific Malaysian born director/producer. From his decade long TV programmes making experience since the 1990s, he has ventured into various genres ranging from documentary, drama to short film.

In 2002, his documentary programme on the life of Sumatran Rhinoceros was nominated best documentary of the 9th Shanghai International Film Festival.

From 2002 to 2005, he was involved in a 251 episode Cantonese drama “Homecoming” as the chief writer cum director. He is also the theme song composer and lyricist!

In 2005, he was selected as one of five directors from various Asian countries to produce and direct a documentary for internationally acclaimed TV station Phoenix Satellite TV of China (Phoenix Television), in commemoration of its 10th anniversary. In 2006, he was involved in 2 drama series “Rhythm of Vibration” & “Sea Providence” both joint-venture projects by CCTV China-Malaysia as executive producer.

In Oct 2006, he established Yellow Pictures Sdn Bhd and produced a series of highly acclaimed programme including “My Roots” documentary series (awarded Best Documentary Director in the 6th Malaysian Oskar Award), “My Malaysia” documentary series, “Dynamic Malaysia” Public Information Short Film series, “Living in Malaysia” documentary series, "My New Village Stories" and "Malaysia My Home - Story of Sabah & Sarawak" (awarded Best TV Documentary in Anugerah Seri Angkasa 2010).

He just completed a film entitled 'The New Village', telling the stories about resettlement of villages in between 1948-1960 during the Malayan Emergency, when the Colonial British fought against the local Communist Guerrilla.

Filmography

Achievements
 2011 Malaysia My Home - Story of Sabah & Sarawak - Best TV Documentary (Anugerah Seri Angkasa 2010)
 2007 My Roots - Best Documentary Director (Anugerah Oskar Malaysia Ke-6)

References
 Award to Astro’s Local Documentary Series - Borneo Post February 26, 2011
 Malaysia My Home won Best TV Documentary - Sin Chew Jit Poh(Chinese) February 20, 2011
 Village Life - The Star May 13, 2009
 Telling New Village Stories - The Sun Daily April 23, 2009
 Exclusive Interview - Yazhou Zhoukan(The International Chinese Newsweekly) November 30, 2008
 My Roots & Malaysia My Home - the present for Malaysians  - Sin Chew Jit Poh(Chinese) August 18, 2008
 Sixth Oskar Award - The Star July 19, 2007

External links
 The Moments by Wong Kew-Lit
 The old nostalgic brands 
 Award to Astro’s local documentary series
 Harmony directed by Wong Kew-Lit
 Wong Kew-Lit at Yellow Pictures

Chinese film directors
Malaysian film directors
Living people
Malaysian people of Chinese descent
Malaysian people of Hakka descent
Malaysian documentary film directors
Malaysian documentary film producers
Year of birth missing (living people)